{{safesubst:#invoke:RfD|||month = March
|day = 16
|year = 2023
|time = 21:57
|timestamp = 20230316215715

|content=
REDIRECT Ptosis

}}